Andrea Riggio or Reggio (1660–1717) was a Roman Catholic prelate who served as Titular Patriarch of Constantinople (1716–1717) and Bishop of Catania (1693–1717).

Biography
Andrea Riggio was born on 10 Mar 1660 in Palermo and ordained a priest on 15 Jan 1685.
On 9 Mar 1693, he was appointed during the papacy of Pope Innocent XII as Bishop of Catania.
On 15 Mar 1693, he was consecrated bishop by Gasparo Carpegna, Cardinal-Priest of Santa Maria in Trastevere, with Petrus Draghi Bartoli, Titular Patriarch of Alexandria, and Michelangelo Mattei, Titular Archbishop of Hadrianopolis in Haemimonto with serving as co-consecrators.
On 13 Jan 1716, he was appointed during the papacy of Pope Clement XI as Titular Patriarch of Constantinople.
He served as Bishop of Catania until his death on 15 Dec 1717.

References

External links and additional sources
 (for Chronology of Bishops) 
 (for Chronology of Bishops) 
 (for Chronology of Bishops) 
 (for Chronology of Bishops) 

17th-century Roman Catholic bishops in Sicily
18th-century Roman Catholic bishops in Sicily
Bishops appointed by Pope Innocent XII
Bishops appointed by Pope Clement XI
1660 births
1717 deaths
Clergy from Palermo